Cosens is a surname.

Notable people with the name include:

Aubrey Cosens (1921–1945), Canadian soldier
Barbara Cosens, American legal scholar 
Dora Cosens (1894–1945), British architect
Ed Cosens, musician with Reverend and The Makers
George Cosens (1805–1881), Jamaican-British minister 
Keith Cosens (1932–1990), Canadian politician

See also
Cosens & Co Ltd

Surnames